Nina is a 1959 French comedy film directed by Jean Boyer and starring Sophie Desmarets, Olivier Hussenot and Agnès Laurent.

The film is based on the 1949 play of the same title by André Roussin. It was shot at the Billancourt Studios in Paris. The film's sets were designed by the art director Jean d'Eaubonne.

Synopsis
A husband plans to shoot the man having an affair with his wife, but both come to realise their desire to escape the tyrannical woman in their lives.

Cast
 Sophie Desmarets as Nina Tessier
 Olivier Hussenot as Un inspecteur
 Agnès Laurent as 	Cécile Redon-Namur
 Jean Poiret as Adolphe Tessier
 Yves Robert as Redon-Namur
 Michel Serrault as Gérard Blonville
 Pierre Tornade as Un inspecteur
 Hélène Tossy as Concierge

References

Bibliography 
 Singer, Michael. Film Directors. Lone Eagle Publishing, 2002.

External links 
 

1959 films
French black-and-white films
French comedy films
1959 comedy films
1950s French-language films
Films directed by Jean Boyer
Films shot at Billancourt Studios
French films based on plays
1950s French films